The 2016–17 season was Dundee's third consecutive season in the top flight of Scottish football since their promotion at the end of the 2013–14 season. Dundee also competed in the League Cup and the Scottish Cup.

Season events
On 17 April, Dundee sacked manager Paul Hartley, replacing him with Neil McCann the following day on an interim basis.

Competitions

Premiership

Results

Scottish Cup

League Cup

Challenge Cup

Squad statistics

Appearances

|-
|colspan="14"|Players away from the club on loan:

|-
|colspan="14"|Players who left Dundee during the season:

|}

Goal scorers

Disciplinary record

Club statistics

League table

League Cup table

Results by round

Transfers

In

Out

Loans in

Loans out

Released

See also
 List of Dundee F.C. seasons

Notes

References

Dundee F.C. seasons
Dundee